The 2015–16 I-League was the ninth season of the I-League, the Indian professional football league, since its establishment in 2007. The season commenced on 9 January 2016, after the Indian Super League finished, and concluded on 24 April 2016.

Bengaluru FC won their second I-League title after winning their first title in 2013–14. The defending champions Mohun Bagan finished second. Aizawl and DSK Shivajians entered the league for the first time in their history, Aizawl through promotion from the I-League 2nd Division and DSK Shivajians through a direct-entry spot.

Teams & Season Details
After the 2014–15 I-League season, three-time I-League champions, Dempo, were relegated to the I-League 2nd Division. Mizo club, Aizawl, were promoted from the 2nd Division earlier in May following a 4–2 victory over Chanmari. DSK Shivajians were announced as the direct-entry club for this season on 12 November 2015.

In August 2015, it was first reported that Pune clubs, Pune, and Bharat F.C., the direct-entry side from the previous season, would be withdrawing from the I-League due to the lack of a "long-term vision" for the league. Then, towards the end of October, it was announced that both Pune and Bharat FC had failed to compile to the AFC-licensing criteria needed to participate in the I-League. On 21 November 2015, it was confirmed that Royal Wahingdoh, another debutant club from the previous season, were withdrawing from the league.

Stadiums and locations

Note: Table lists in alphabetical order.

Personnel and kits

Head coaching changes

Transfers

Foreign players
Restricting the number of foreign players strictly to Five per team. A team could use Four foreign players on the field each game.

League table

Result table

Season statistics

Top scorers

Top Indian scorers

Hat-tricks

Awards

AIFF Awards
All India Football Federation awarded the following awards for the I-League season.
 Best player of I-League: Sony Norde (Mohun Bagan)
 Best goalkeeper of I-League: Amrinder Singh (Bengaluru FC)
 Best defender of I-League: John Johnson (Bengaluru FC)
 Best midfielder of I-League: Eugeneson Lyngdoh (Bengaluru FC)
 Best forward of I-League: Ranti Martins (East Bengal)
 Best coach of I-League: Ashley Westwood (Bengaluru FC)
 Best organizer of I-League: Bengaluru FC

References

External links
 Official website

See also
 2015–16 Bengaluru FC season
 2015–16 East Bengal F.C. season
 2015–16 Mohun Bagan A.C. season
 2015–16 I-League 2nd Division
 2015–16 I-League U18
2015–16 I-League Youth U15

 
I-League seasons
1